K. flavescens may refer to:

 Kinosternon flavescens, a mud turtle
 Kunzea flavescens, a dicotyledon plant